What the Dead Know is a crime thriller by the American writer Laura Lippman, published in 2007. The story, set in Baltimore in 2005, is about an investigation into a woman who claims to be Heather Bethany, a girl who had gone missing thirty years before. The book was critically acclaimed and it won the 2007 Quill Award in the mystery/suspense/thriller category and 2008 Anthony Award for Best Novel.

Critical reception
Reviewers saw What the Dead Know as a success both as a well-crafted mystery and as an emotionally powerful novel. The Guardian described the novel as a "realistic and poignant detailing of emotional hide-and-seek, ... an excellent mystery and a thoughtful exploration of the nature and effects of grief and loss." Kirkus Reviews praised the novel, noting that "Lippman (To the Power of Three, 2005, etc.) crafts a tale that resonates long after the last page is turned." Janet Maslin of The New York Times praised What the Dead Know as "an uncommonly clever imposter story", "three-dimensional", and worthy of reading a second time — "You read it once just to move breathlessly toward the finale. Then you revisit it to marvel at how well Ms. Lippman pulled the wool over your eyes."

Main characters, as first introduced
 The Bethany family: Dave and Miriam (née Toles); daughters Heather and Sunny
 Penelope Jackson – registered owner of a car in a highway accident
 Detective Kevin Infante – lead investigator
 Harold Lenhardt – Infante's sergeant
 Gloria Bustamante – lawyer
 Nancy Porter – police researcher and Infante's former police partner
 Kay Sullivan – social worker at St. Agnes Hospital; children Seth and Grace
 Dr. Schumeier – psychiatrist at St. Agnes Hospital
 Chester "Chet" V. Willoughby IV – retired detective
 Stan Dunham – former Pennsylvania property owner
 Irene – a foster mother
 Tony Dunham – man killed in a Florida house fire
 Roy Pincharelli – music teacher
 Joe – art gallery owner
 Javier – art gallery employee
 Jeff and Thelma Baumgarten – couple in fidelity crisis
 Ruth Leibig – Ohio school girl
 Estelle and Herb Turner – practitioners of Fivefold Path spirituality
 Priscilla "Syl" Browne – employee at "Swiss Colony" restaurant

References

2007 American novels
American thriller novels
American crime novels
Anthony Award-winning works
Macavity Award-winning works
Barry Award-winning works
Novels set in Baltimore